The Galicia national basketball team is the basketball team of Galicia (Spain). The team is not affiliated to FIBA, so only plays friendly games.

History
Galicia's first game was held in 2006 in Lugo against Japan and the next year, the team played against Cuba. Galicia won only the first game.

One year later, Galicia started to play the Torneo de las Naciones, a tournament co-organized with Basque Country and Catalonia. It was played from 2008 to 2010.

Games played

Women's team

Games played

List of Galician basketball players who also represented FIBA teams in international matches

See also
Galicia national football team
Torneo de las Naciones

References

External links
Galician Basketball Federation website

Sport in Galicia (Spain)
Galicia